James Ramsell (22 November 1892 – 3 January 1962) was an Irish hurler who played as a left wing-back for the Cork senior team.

Ramsell made his first appearance for the team during the 1914 championship and was a regular member of the starting fifteen until his retirement after the 1917 championship. During that time he won one Munster medal. Murphy was an All-Ireland runner-up on one occasion.

At club level Ramsell was a two-time county club championship medal winner with Midleton.

References

1892 births
1962 deaths
Midleton hurlers
Cork inter-county hurlers